This is a list of events in British radio during 1978.

Events

January
No events.

February
No events.

March
8 March – The first episode of The Hitchhiker's Guide to the Galaxy – the radio series later to be turned into a book, a television programme, a game, and a film – is broadcast on BBC Radio 4.
26 March – Tom Browne presents BBC Radio 1's Top 20 show for the final time.

April
1 April – BBC Radio 2's broadcasting hours are extended when budget restrictions are eased, and the pre 1975 broadcasting hours of 5am2am are re-introduced.
2 April – Simon Bates replaces Tom Browne on BBC Radio 1's Top 20 show.
3 April – Permanent radio broadcasts of proceedings in the House of Commons begin; George Thomas is the Speaker.
11 April – Denis Healey, the Chancellor of the Exchequer, presents the first budget to the House of Commons to be heard on the radio.
29 April – Noel Edmonds presents his final Radio 1 Breakfast Show.

May
2 May – Dave Lee Travis succeeds Noel Edmonds as presenter of The Radio 1 Breakfast Show.

June
No events.

July
3 July
 After just over a year of being broadcast in two parts, Today once again becomes a continuous two-hour programme. It now airs on BBC Radio 4 from 6.30am until just after 8.30am.
The radio play Pearl by John Arden is first performed.

August
No events.

September
No events.

October
No events.

Autumn
Ahead of the launch of BBC Radio Wales, four experimental local radio stations broadcasting for a single week take place. They are Radio Wrexham, Radio Deeside, Radio Merthyr and Radio Rhondda.

November
12 November – Radio 1's Sunday teatime chart show is extended from a Top 20 countdown to a Top 40 countdown. Simon Bates is the presenter having taken over as host from Tom Browne earlier in the year.
17 November – The Friday Rock Show, presented by Tommy Vance, makes its debut on BBC Radio 1. Tommy remains the programme’s presenter until he moves to Virgin 1215 in April 1993. 
23 November –
 All BBC national radio stations change their medium or long wave transmission wavelength as part of a plan for BBC AM broadcasting in order to improve national AM reception, and to conform with the Geneva Frequency Plan of 1975. Radio 1's transmission wavelength is moved from 247m (1214 kHz) to 275 & 285m (1053 & 1089 kHz) medium wave. Radio 2's wavelength is moved from 1500m (200 kHz) long wave to 433 & 330m (693 & 909 kHz) medium wave.  Radio 3 is moved from 464m (647 kHz) to 247m (1215 kHz) medium wave.  Radio 4 is moved from various medium wavelengths to 1500m (200 kHz) long wave.
 The shipping forecast transfers from BBC Radio 2 to BBC Radio 4 so that the forecast can continue to be broadcast on long wave.
 The Radio 4 UK Theme is used for the first time to coincide with the network becoming a fully national service for the first time and to underline this the station officially becomes known as Radio 4 UK.
 BBC Radio Scotland and BBC Radio Wales launch as full time stations on the former Radio 4 Scottish and Welsh medium wave opt-out wavelengths of 370m (810 kHz) and 340m (882 kHz) respectively, albeit initially with very limited broadcast hours due to very limited coverage of Radio 4 on FM in both countries. The establishment of separate networks has been made possible by the transfer of Radio 4 to a fully UK-wide network on moving from medium wave to long wave.

December
22 December – Industrial action at the BBC by the ABS union, which started the previous day, is extended to radio when the radio unions join their television counterparts and go on strike too, forcing the BBC to merge its four national radio networks from 4.00pm into one national radio station called the BBC All Network Radio Service. The strike is settled shortly before 10.00pm tonight with unions and BBC management reaching a pay agreement at the British government's industrial disputes arbitration service ACAS.

Station debuts
13 November – BBC Radio Wales
23 November – BBC Radio Scotland

Closing this year

Programme debuts
 26 December – The 27-Year Itch on BBC Radio 4 (1978–80)

Continuing radio programmes

1940s
 Sunday Half Hour (1940–2018)
 Desert Island Discs (1942–Present)
 Down Your Way (1946–1992)
 Letter from America (1946–2004)
 Woman's Hour (1946–Present)
 A Book at Bedtime (1949–Present)

1950s
 The Archers (1950–Present)
 The Today Programme (1957–Present)
 Sing Something Simple (1959–2001)
 Your Hundred Best Tunes (1959–2007)

1960s
 Farming Today (1960–Present)
 In Touch (1961–Present)
 Petticoat Line (1965–1979)
 The World at One (1965–Present)
 The Official Chart (1967–Present)
 Just a Minute (1967–Present)
 The Living World (1968–Present)
 The Organist Entertains (1969–2018)

1970s
 PM (1970–Present)
 Start the Week (1970–Present)
 Week Ending (1970–1998)
 You and Yours (1970–Present)
 I'm Sorry I Haven't a Clue (1972–Present)
 Good Morning Scotland (1973–Present)
 Hello Cheeky (1973–1979)
 Kaleidoscope (1973–1998)
 Newsbeat (1973–Present)
 The News Huddlines (1975–2001)
 The Burkiss Way (1976–1980)
 File on 4 (1977–Present)
 Money Box (1977–Present)
 The News Quiz (1977–Present)

Ending this year
 30 June – Up to the Hour (1977–1978)

Births
 21 January – Rachael Bland, journalist, newsreader and presenter (BBC Radio 5 Live) (d. 2018)
 6 April – Myleene Klass, singer and broadcast presenter
 28 April – Lauren Laverne, radio and television presenter
 18 July – Annie Mac(Manus), Irish-born DJ
 22 July – Martyn Lee, radio host and producer
 6 December – Rigsy, Northern Ireland broadcast presenter and DJ

Deaths
15 January – Jack Jackson, 71, trumpeter, bandleader and disc jockey
19 January – Donald McCullough, 76, broadcaster (The Brains Trust)
26 January – Leo Genn, 72, actor
24 February – Mrs Mills, 59, pianist (heart attack)
12 March – Tolchard Evans, 76, songwriter, composer, pianist and bandleader
25 March – Jack Hulbert, 85, actor (Discord in Three Flats)
25 March – Thomas Woodrooffe, 79, naval officer and radio commentator
27 March – Wilfred Pickles, 73, radio presenter
2 April – Ray Noble, 74, bandleader, composer, arranger, radio comedian, and actor
31 July – Carleton Hobbs, 80, actor
14 August – Victor Silvester, 78, bandleader

See also 
 1978 in British music
 1978 in British television
 1978 in the United Kingdom
 List of British films of 1978

References

Radio
British Radio, 1978 In
Years in British radio